Caladenia hirta, commonly known as sugar candy orchid, flowering plant in the orchid family Orchidaceae and endemic to the south-west of Western Australia. It is a ground orchid with a single broad, hairy leaf and up to six white or pink and white flowers with pink markings.

Description 
Flowering time depends on subspecies.

Taxonomy and naming
Caladenia hirta was first formally in 1840 by John Lindley in A Sketch of the Vegetation of the Swan River Colony.

In 2001, Stephen Hopper and Andrew Phillip Brown described two subspecies of Caladenia hirta in the journal Nuytsia and the names are accepted by the Australian Plant Census:

Distribution and habitat
Candy orchid is a common subspecies of C. hirta and grows in Banksia, tuart and peppermint woodland between Arrowsmith and Albany in the Avon Wheatbelt, Esperance Plains, Geraldton Sandplains, Jarrah Forest, Swan Coastal Plain and Warren bioregions of south-west Western Australia. Pink candy orchid is also common and widespread, often growing on granite outcrops, on the edges of salt lakes, and other moist areas, between Kalbarri and Israelite Bay in the Avon Wheatbelt, Coolgardie, Esperance Plains, Geraldton Sandplains, Jarrah Forest, Mallee, Murchison, Swan Coastal Plain, Warren and Yalgoo bioregions.

References

External links 

hirta
Orchids of Western Australia
Endemic orchids of Australia
Plants described in 1840
Taxa named by John Lindley